Desert racing is the act of racing through the desert in a two- or four-wheeled off-road vehicle.

Point-to-point–style races, including the famous Mint 400 and Baja 1000, attract nationally ranked and celebrity drivers. This type of racing tests the endurance and capabilities of racer and machine, and while organized clubs or teams sometimes field multiple sponsored riders for particular events, desert racing in its purest form is largely an individual endeavor. Winning racers accrue points to advance their rank and placement in future contests.

Desert racing vehicles, which include rugged enduro-style motorcycle, four wheeled all-terrain vehicles, trucks (like Group T4), pickup trucks (like Trophy Trucks), and dune buggies, have specialized suspensions with increased wheel travel. The now-defunct Barstow to Vegas, which was held in the Mojave Desert from 1967 to 1975 and 1983 to 1989, was a well-known example of desert racing in North America. Desert racing, in its most organized form, began in Southern California in the 1920s.

The sport has also seen rapid developments in other countries. In Pakistan, the Cholistan Desert Rally began in 2005, with more than 100 drivers in the 2018 event won by Mir Nadir Ali Khan Magsi.

See also
 Off-road racing
 Dakar Rally
 Budapest-Bamako
Cholistan Desert Rally

References

Rally raids
Auto racing by type
Motorcycle racing by type